Arius uncinatus is a species of fish in the family Ariidae. It is endemic to Madagascar.  Its natural habitats are rivers and freshwater lakes. It is threatened by habitat loss.

References

uncinatus
Freshwater fish of Madagascar
Taxonomy articles created by Polbot
Fish described in 2003